Sentinus is a educational charity based in Lisburn, Northern Ireland that provides educational programs for young people interested in science, technology, engineering and mathematics (STEM).

History
Northern Ireland produces around 2,000 qualified IT workers each year; there are around 16,000 IT jobs in the Northern Ireland economy.

Function
It works with EngineeringUK and the Council for the Curriculum, Examinations & Assessment (CCEA). It works with primary and secondary schools in Northern Ireland. 

It runs summer placements for IT workshops for those of sixth form age (16-18). It offers Robotics Roadshows for primary school children.

Sentinus Young Innovators

Sentinus hosts the annual  Big Bang  Northern Ireland Fair which incorporates Sentinus Young Innovators. This is a one day science and engineering project exhibition for post-primary students. It is one of largest such events in the United Kingdom. In 2019 over 3,000 students participated from 130 schools across both Northern Ireland and the Republic of Ireland.

The competition is affiliated with the International Science and Engineering Fair (ISEF) and the Broadcom MASTERS program. The overall winner represents Northern Ireland at the following year's ISEF.

Past Overall Winners

See also
 Discover Science & Engineering, equivalent in the Republic of Ireland
 Science Week Ireland
 The Big Bang Fair
 Young Scientist and Technology Exhibition

References

External links
 Sentinus

Computer science education in the United Kingdom
Educational charities based in the United Kingdom
Educational organisations based in Northern Ireland
Engineering education in the United Kingdom
Engineering organizations
Learning programs in Europe
Mathematics education in the United Kingdom
Science and technology in Northern Ireland
Science events in the United Kingdom